Ostrinia marginalis is a moth in the family Crambidae. It was described by Francis Walker in 1866. It is found in North America, where it has been recorded from Newfoundland and Maine west to Alberta, the Northwest Territories and Yukon. The habitat consists of bogs and marshes.

The wingspan is 15–17 mm. The forewings and hindwings are dark brown with a white postmedial line.

The larvae feed on Rumex and Polygonum species.

References

Moths described in 1866
Pyraustinae